Acetylleucine is a modified amino acid used in the treatment of vertigo and cerebellar ataxia.

Acetylleucine is also being developed as a possible treatment for several neurological disorders by IntraBio Inc.  Clinical trials with acetylleucine for the treatment of three orphan, fatal, neurodegenerative disorders are underway: Niemann-Pick disease type C, GM2 gangliosidoses (Tay-Sachs and Sandhoff diseases), and ataxia–telangiectasia. In 2020, IntraBio announced the successful multinational clinical trial results of the Niemann-Pick type C clinical trial. IntraBio is also investigating acetylleucine for the treatment of common inherited and acquired neurological diseases including Lewy body dementia, amyotrophic lateral sclerosis, restless legs syndrome, multiple sclerosis, and migraine  Acetylleucine has received orphan drug designations from the U.S. Food & Drug Administration (FDA) and the European Commission.

See also
 Leucine

References

Amino acid derivatives
Acetamides